Theodemir or Theodomar (Galician and ; died 847), was a bishop of Iria, in Galicia. 

At some point between year 818, when Bishop Quendulf was still alive, and 842 when king Alfonso II of Asturias died, Pelagius the Hermit saw mysterious lights, like a shower of stars, on the same hill in the forest near Solovio every night. He went and reported the phenomenon to Bishop Theodemir. 

Theodemir gathered a small entourage and went to Solovio to see the phenomenon for himself. There, in the dense vegetation, they discovered a stone sepulchre in which rested the corpses of three men, who were immediately identified as the Apostle James the Great and two of his disciples, Theodore and Athanasius. Theodemir believed that this was in line with the Breviary of the Apostles, which taught that James was buried in an ark in Marmarica (arca marmárica), but he said "arca de mármol" or an ark of marble was meant.

References

Bishops and archbishops of Iria and Compostela
847 deaths
Year of birth unknown
9th-century Asturian people